Eight-Ball Andy is an American comedy short released by Columbia Pictures on March 11, 1948. It stars Andy Clyde, Dick Wessel, Maude Prickett, Florence Auer, and Vernon Dent.

Plot

Andy and his wife, Ruthie (Prickett) are busy moving into their new apartment. The cause of this was Andy's brother-in-law Claude Beasley (Wessel) who was learning to play the trombone in all hours of the night that the landlord kicked all of them out of their old one. Also living with them is Ruth's mother Mrs. Beasley (Auer) who strongly despises Andy. Thinking that Claude is away living at another apartment, Andy discovers that Claude has returned and plans to invent a state-of-the-art termite spray.

Later on, Claude tries out the formula by dumping a jar of termites onto a wooden plank that Andy was using to reach the ceiling while painting it. The spray, however, causes the plank to melt in half and Andy crashes to the floor. While Claude is out of the room, Andy substitutes the broken plank for a new one. Claude comes back in, looks at the plank, not knowing it was replaced, and thinking that the spray worked, he happily decides to try to sell the formula to Andy's boss Mr. Bradshaw (Dent) when hey invite him over to dinner, which Andy is strongly against.

At dinner, several things go wrong, Bradshaw impacts a couple breakaway chairs. The second one causes a jar of termites to fall and crawl all over Mr. Bradshaw clothes and he bolts to the kitchen. Angry, Andy tosses the termite spray on the other side of the room, causing it to melt the floor. He discovers that he used the table to spray for termites, which just collapses. Enraged, Andy walks towards the kitchen but falls through the floor and to the downstairs apartment, spooking and fainting a lady ironing her dress. Bewildered, Andy looks around for help. Her jealous husband, in the middle of his daily shave, hears the crash and chases Andy out of the apartment. Soon after, Claude and Bradshaw accidentally fall down to the same apartment and both get beaten to a pulp by the jealous husband. When they re-enter Andy's apartment, Bradshaw angrily informs him to get rid of Claude or Andy is fired, Andy jumps at the chance and orders Claude and Mrs. Beasley out of the apartment. Before they leave, Claude tells Andy he invented a new gasoline and tried it out on his mother's car. It soon explodes and Mrs. Beasley physically scolds Claude form off-screen.

Soon after, Andy discovers that the Chicken is still in the oven. But, he falls to the downstairs apartment. He wearily says his trademark line "Oh, my, oh, my, my." as the short ends.

Cast
 Andy Clyde as Andy 
 Dick Wessel as Claude Beasley
 Maudie Prickett as Ruth Clyde
 Florence Auer as Mrs. Beasley
 Vernon Dent as Mr. Bradshaw (uncredited)
 Ralph Volkie as Wilbur, Jealous Husband (uncredited)

Notes

This was remade in 1956 as Andy Goes Wild. Producer/director Jules White had brought in Wessel and Prickett to film the new footage. Auer and Dent appear only in archive footage.

External links
 
 

1948 films
1948 comedy films
Columbia Pictures short films
American comedy short films
American black-and-white films
1940s American films